The russet nightingale-thrush (Catharus occidentalis) is a species of bird in the family Turdidae. It is endemic to Mexico.

Its natural habitat is subtropical or tropical moist montane forests.

Description
Crown, back and wings brown. Face pale gray. Throat and belly pale gray, washed dusky. Breast pale gray mottled dusky. Juveniles more strongly mottled on breast and sides.
Very similar to the ruddy-capped nightingale-thrush. Tell apart from song or in flight by yellow bar on the secondary feathers below the wing, present only in the russet nightingale-thrush.

References

 Howell, Steve N.G. and Webb, Sophie (1995) A guide to the birds of Mexico and northern Central America. Oxford University Press.

Further reading

Birds described in 1859
Taxa named by Philip Sclater
Birds of Mexico
Catharus
Endemic birds of Mexico
Taxonomy articles created by Polbot
Birds of the Sierra Madre Occidental
Birds of the Sierra Madre Oriental
Birds of the Sierra Madre del Sur
Birds of the Trans-Mexican Volcanic Belt